Richfield is an unincorporated community and census-designated place (CDP) in Juniata and Snyder counties in Pennsylvania, United States. The population was 549 at the 2010 census.

Geography
Richfield is located in eastern Juniata County and southern Snyder County at  (40.688365, -77.111816). The bulk of the community is in the northern part of Monroe Township, Juniata County, but part lies to the north in the southern part of West Perry Township, Snyder County. The township and county line follows the West Branch of Mahantango Creek, which runs from west to east, north of the center of town.

Pennsylvania Route 35 is the main road through the community, leading northeast  to Selinsgrove and southwest  to Mifflintown, the Juniata county seat.

Demographics
As of the census of 2000, there were 459 people, 160 households, and 123 families residing in the CDP. The population density was 548.1 people per square mile (211.0/km). There were 177 housing units at an average density of 211.3/sq mi (81.4/km). The racial makeup of the CDP was 98.47% White, 0.22% from other races, and 1.31% from two or more races. Hispanic or Latino of any race were 0.65% of the population.

There were 160 households, out of which 31.3% had children under the age of 18 living with them, 71.3% were married couples living together, 3.8% had a female householder with no husband present, and 23.1% were non-families. 20.6% of all households were made up of individuals, and 13.1% had someone living alone who was 65 years of age or older. The average household size was 2.58 and the average family size was 2.97.

In the CDP, the population was spread out, with 21.4% under the age of 18, 6.5% from 18 to 24, 25.3% from 25 to 44, 20.9% from 45 to 64, and 25.9% who were 65 years of age or older. The median age was 43 years. For every 100 females, there were 95.3 males. For every 100 females age 18 and over, there were 85.1 males.

The median income for a household in the CDP was $35,333, and the median income for a family was $39,375. Males had a median income of $29,750 versus $22,500 for females. The per capita income for the CDP was $17,555. About 5.8% of families and 9.6% of the population were below the poverty line, including 20.0% of those under age 18 and 3.6% of those age 65 or over.

References

Census-designated places in Juniata County, Pennsylvania
Census-designated places in Pennsylvania